Asperula subulifolia is a species of flowering plant in the family Rubiaceae. It was first described in  1928 and is endemic to Australia.

References 

subulifolia